Chander Kanta Gupta  (8 October 1938 – 27 March 2016) was a Canadian distinguished professor of mathematics at the University of Manitoba, known for her research in abstract algebra and group theory. Much of her research concerns the automorphisms in different varieties of groups.

Education
Gupta earned a bachelor's degree from the University of Jammu and Kashmir, a master's degree from the Aligarh Muslim University, another master's degree from the Australian National University, and a Ph.D. in 1967 from ANU under the supervision of Michael Frederick Newman.

Recognition
She was elected to the Royal Society of Canada in 1991, and awarded the Krieger–Nelson Prize of the Canadian Mathematical Society in 2000.

Personal
Her husband, Narain Gupta (1936–2008) was also an ANU alumnus, and a distinguished professor of mathematics at the University of Manitoba.

References

1938 births
2016 deaths
20th-century Indian mathematicians
Indian women mathematicians
Canadian mathematicians
Canadian women mathematicians
Aligarh Muslim University alumni
Australian National University alumni
Academic staff of the University of Manitoba
Fellows of the Royal Society of Canada
Indian group theorists
Scientists from Jammu and Kashmir
20th-century Indian women scientists
21st-century Indian mathematicians
Women scientists from Jammu and Kashmir
21st-century Indian women scientists
20th-century women mathematicians
21st-century women mathematicians